

Squad
As of August 13, 2008

Transfers

Summer 2008

In:

Out:

Out on loan:

Appearances and goals

Correct as of 00:33, 14 August 2008 (UTC) 

|}

Top scorers
Friendlies not included

Matches

Pre-season friendlies

Serie A

References

U.C. Sampdoria seasons
Sampdoria